Orokolo is a Trans–New Guinea language spoken in Ihu Rural LLG, Gulf Province, Papua New Guinea by about 50,000 people (2010). Alternate names are Bailala, Haira, Kaipi, Kairu-Kaura, Muro, Muru, Vailala, and West Elema. It is spoken in various villages, including Vailala.

Literature 
This first New Testament (Pupu Oharo Āre ) was translated by the Rev. S. H. Dewdney, a Congregational missionary with the London Missionary Society, and Lavako Maika, an evangelist. It was published by the British and Foreign Bible Society in 1963.  Genesis, called Genese, was published by the British and Foreign Bible Society in Australia in 1970.  Ruth, called Rute, was published by the Bible Society in Australia, in 1972.

External links 
 Materials on Orokolo are included in the open access Arthur Capell collection (AC1) and Tom Dutton (TD1) collection held by Paradisec.
 The New Testament is on YouVersion.

References

Eleman languages
Languages of Gulf Province